Crispín Oben (January 7, 1876 – August 29, 1947) was a Filipino lawyer and politician born in Lumban, Laguna, Philippines. Born during Spanish colonial rule, he belonged to the prominent Oben family who were of the Illsutrado class. A learned man who was born into a bilingual Spanish-Tagalog household, he also learned the English language from an ex-American soldier. Crispín Oben finished his Bachelor of Arts Degree at Colegio de San Juan de Letran in 1895. He then proceeded to study at the University of Santo Tomas from 1895–1898. He studied law at the Escuela de Derecho from 1900–1902. He was a member of the First Philippine Assembly from 1907 to 1909 representing the second district of La Laguna.

He was married to Victoria Capistrano with whom he had twelve children, four of whom became nuns. His son, Ramón Tomás Oben, went on to become the Commissioner for the Bureau of Internal Revenue under the administration of President Diosdado Macapagal and the Dean of Law at the University of Santo Tomas.

References

External link 
http://deo-antonio.blogspot.com/2012/01/something-interesting-about-llamas_9526.html?m=1

1876 births
1947 deaths
People from Laguna (province)
20th-century Filipino lawyers
Nacionalista Party politicians
Members of the House of Representatives of the Philippines from Laguna (province)
Colegio de San Juan de Letran alumni
University of Santo Tomas alumni
Members of the Philippine Legislature